This is a list of lesbian, gay, bisexual, and transgender-related films that were directed by women. LGBT-themed films directed by women – especially, but not exclusively, lesbian-themed movies – are an important and distinct subset of the genre. Academics have studied the issue of how women as directors contribute to the way lesbian stories, in particular, have been told; while LGBT media, and to some extent the mainstream, have examined the difference a "female gaze" brings to a film.

Telefilms and documentaries are included in the list. Films co-directed with men are not included. Titles beginning with determiners "A", "An", and "The" are alphabetized by the first significant word.

0–9

 2 Seconds (1998, Canada) by Manon Briand
 A 20th Century Chocolate Cake (1983, Canada) by Lois Siegel 
 3 Generations (2015, United States) by Gaby Dellal
 52 Tuesdays (2014, Australia) by Sophie Hyde
 533 Statements (2006, Canada) by Tori Foster
 20,000 Species of Bees (2023, Spain) by Estibaliz Urresola Solaguren

A

 Accidental Activists (2016, United States) by Mandi Wright
 Addicted to Fresno (2015, United States) by Jamie Babbit
 Ahead of the Curve (2020, United States) by Jen Rainin and Rivkah Beth
 Alice (2002, France/United Kingdom) by Sylvie Ballyot
 Alice & Iza (2018, United States) by Christin Baker
 All About E (2015, Australia) by Louise Wadley
 All About Love (De xian chao fan) (2010, Hong Kong) by Ann Hui
 All God's Children (1996, United States) by Sylvia Rhue, Frances Reid, and Dee Mosbacher
 All Over Me (1997, United States) by Alex Sichel
 Almost Adults (2017, Canada) by Sarah Rotella
 Amazones d'Hier, Lesbiennes d'Aujourd'hui (Amazons of Yesterday, Lesbians of Today) (1981, Canada) by Réseau Vidé-Elle feminist collective
 The Amina Profile (2015, Canada) by Sophie Deraspe
 Amour de Femme (A Woman's Love) (2001, France) by Sylvie Verheyde
 Anatomy of a Love Seen (2014, United States) by Marina Rice Bader
 And Breathe Normally (Andið eðlilega) (2018, Iceland) by Ísold Uggadóttir
 And Then Came Lola (2009, United States) by Ellen Seidler and Megan Siler
 Anita's Last Cha-Cha (film) (Ang huling cha-cha ni Anita) (2013, Philippines) by Sigrid Andrea Bernardo
 Anne Trister (1986, Canada) by Léa Pool
 Antonia's Line (1995, Netherlands) by Marleen Gorris
 Appropriate Behavior (2014, United Kingdom) by Desiree Akhavan
 April's Shower (2003, United States) by Trish Doolan
 The Archivettes (2019, United States) by Megan Rossman
 Atomic Saké (1999, Canada) by Louise Archambault
 Ava's Impossible Things (2016, United States) by Marina Rice Bader
 AWOL (2016, United States) by Deb Shoval
 Axolotl Overkill (2017, Germany) by Helene Hegemann

B

 The Baby Formula (2008, Canada) by Alison Reid
 Baby Jane (2019, Finland) by Katja Gauriloff
 Bandaged (2009, Germany/United States/France) by Maria Beatty
 Bar Girls (1994, United States) by Marita Giovanni
 Bare (2015, United States) by Natalia Leite
 Be Like Others (2008, Canada/United Kingdom/United States/France) by Tanaz Eshaghian
 Beach Rats (2017, United States) by Eliza Hittman
 Beautiful Thing (1996, United Kingdom) by Hettie MacDonald
 Bedrooms and Hallways (1998, United Kingdom) by Rose Troche
 Before Stonewall (1984, United States) by Greta Schiller
 Before You Know It (2019, United States) by Hannah Pearl Utt
 Below Her Mouth (2016, Canada) by April Mullen
 Below the Belt (1999, Canada) by Dominique Cardona and Laurie Colbert
 The Berlin Affair (Interno Berlinese) (1985, Italy/West Germany) by Liliana Cavani
 Bessie (2015, United States) by Dee Rees
 Better Than Chocolate (1999, Canada) by Anne Wheeler
 Beyond Good and Evil (Al di là del bene e del male) (1977, Italy) by Liliana Cavani
 Billie and Emma (2018, Philippines) by Samantha Lee
 Blockers (2018, United States) by Kay Cannon
 Blokes (2010, Chile) by Marialy Rivas
 BloodSisters (1995, United States) by Michelle Handelman
 Bloodthirsty (2020, Canada) by Amelia Moses
 Bloomington (2010, United States) by Fernanda Cardoso
 Blue Jean (2022, United Kingdom) by Georgia Oakley
 Blush (Barash) (2015, Israel) by Michal Vinik
 The Book of Gabrielle (2016, United Kingdom) by Lisa Gornick
 Booksmart (2019, United States) by Olivia Wilde
 Born in Flames (1983, United States) by Lizzie Borden
 Bound (1996, United States) by The Wachowskis
 A Boy Named Sue (2001, United States) by Julie Wyman
 Boys Don't Cry (1999, United States) by Kimberly Peirce
 The Brandon Teena Story (1998, United States) by Susan Muska and Gréta Olafsdóttir
 Break My Fall (2011, United Kingdom) by Kanchi Wichmann
 Breaking the Girls (2012, United States) by Jamie Babbit
 Bruised (2020, United States/United Kingdom) by Halle Berry
 Bulbul Can Sing (2018, India) by Rima Das
 But I'm a Cheerleader (1999, United States) by Jamie Babbit
 Butch Mystique (2003, United States) by Debra A. Wilson
 Butterfly (Húdié) (2004, Hong Kong) by Yan Yan Mak
 Bye Bye Blondie (2012, France) by Virginie Despentes

C

 Camp Belvidere (2014, United States) by Astrid Ovalles and Oriana Oppice
 Can You Ever Forgive Me? (2018, United States) by Marielle Heller
 Candyman (2021, United States/Canada) by Nia DaCosta
 Caramel (2007, Lebanon) by Nadine Labaki
 Carmen and Lola (Carmen y Lola) (2018, Spain) by Arantxa Echevarría
 Carmilla (2019, United Kingdom) by Emily Harris
 Catherine Opie b. 1961 (2019, United States) by Sini Anderson
 Chaos and Desire (2002, Canada) by Manon Briand
 Choosing Children (1985, United States) by Debra Chasnoff
 Christmas at the Ranch (2021, United States) by Christin Baker
 Chutney Popcorn (1999, United States) by Nisha Ganatra
 Circumstance (Šar'ayet) (2011, France/Iran/United States) by Maryam Keshavarz
 Circus of Books (2019, United States) by Rachel Mason
 Claire of the Moon (1992, United States) by Nicole Conn
 Clambake (2015, United States) by Andrea Meyerson
 Clementine (2019, United States) by Lara Gallagher
 Close-Knit (Karera ga honki de amu toki wa) (2017, Japan) by Naoko Ogigami
 Codependent Lesbian Space Alien Seeks Same (2011, United States) by Madeleine Olnek
 Common Ground (2000, United States) by Donna Deitch
 Como Esquecer (So Hard to Forget) (2010, Brazil) by Malu de Martino
 The Company of Strangers (1990, Canada) by Cynthia Scott
 Compulsus (2022, Canada) by Tara Thorne
 Concussion (2013, United States) by Stacie Passon
 Cosa Bella (2006, United States) by Fiona Mackenzie
 Costa Brava (1995, Spain) by Marta Balletbò-Coll
 Cowboys (2020, United States) by Anna Kerrigan
 Cracks (2009, United Kingdom) by Jordan Scott
 The Cricket and the Ant (La Cigale et la Fourmi) (2016, Germany) by Julia Ritschel
 Cynara: Poetry in Motion (1996, United States) by Nicole Conn

D

 Daddy Issues (2018, United States) by Amara Cash
 Dancing Queens  (2021, Sweden) by Helena Bergström
 Daphne (2007, United Kingdom) by Clare Beavan
 Dawn, Her Dad and the Tractor (2021, Canada) by Shelley Thompson
 D.E.B.S. (2004, United States) by Angela Robinson
 Death of a Poetess (2017, Israel) by Efrat Mishori and Dana Goldberg
 Desert Hearts (1985, United States) by Donna Deitch
 Desi's Looking for a New Girl (2000, United States) by Mary Guzmán
 Despite Everything (A pesar de todo) (2019, Spain) by Gabriela Tagliavini
 Die Konkurrentin (The Competitor) (1997, Germany) by Dagmar Hirtz
 Dim Sum Funeral (2008, United States) by Anna Chi
 The Divide (La Fracture) (2021, France) by Catherine Corsini
 Do I Love You? (2003, United Kingdom) by Lisa Gornick
 Dolls (Pusinky) (2007, Czech Republic) by Karin Babinská
 Domestic Bliss (1985, United Kingdom) by Joy Chamberlain
 Don't Look at Me That Way (Schau mich nicht so an) (2015, Germany) by Uisenma Borchu
 Drifting Flowers (Piao Lang Qing Chun) (2008, Taiwan) by Zero Chou
 Dustin (2020, France) by Naïla Guiguet
 Dykes, Camera, Action! (2018, United States) by Caroline Berler
 Dyketactics (1974, United States) by Barbara Hammer
 Dysphoric: Fleeing Womanhood Like a House on Fire (2021, India) by Vaishnavi Sundar

E

 Edie & Thea: A Very Long Engagement (2009, United States) by Susan Muska and Greta Olafsdottir
 Ek Ladki Ko Dekha Toh Aisa Laga (How I Felt When I Saw That Girl) (2019, India) by Shelly Chopra Dhar
 Elena Undone (2010, United States) by Nicole Conn
 Elisa & Marcela (2019, Spain) by Isabel Coixet
 Ellie & Abbie (& Ellie's Dead Aunt)  (2020, Australia) by Monica Zanetti
 êmîcêtôcêt: Many Bloodlines (2020, Canada) by Theola Ross
 Eva & Candela (¿Cómo te llamas?) (2018, Colombia) by Ruth Caudeli
 Ever After (Endzeit) (2019, Germany) by Carolina Hellsgård
 Everything Relative (1996, United States) by Sharon Pollack
 Everything Will Be Fine (Alles wird gut) (1998, Germany) by Angelina Maccarone

F

 A Family Affair (2001, United States) by Helen Lesnick
 Family Pack (2000, Belgium/Canada/France/Switzerland) by Chris Vander Stappen
 Fanny: The Right to Rock (2021, Canada) by Bobbi Jo Hart
 Fear of Water (2014, United Kingdom) by Kate Lane
 Fear Street Part One: 1994 (2021, United States) by Leigh Janiak
 The Feels (2017, United States) by Jenée LaMarque
 Female Perversions (1996, United States) by Susan Streitfeld
 Finding Mr. Wright (2011, United States) by Nancy Criss
 Finding North (1998, United States) by Tanya Wexler
 Finn's Girl (2007, Canada) by Dominique Cardona and Laurie Colbert
 Fire (1996, India/Canada) by Deepa Mehta
 The Firefly (La luciérnaga) (2015, Colombia) by Ana Maria Hermida
 The Fish Child (El niño pez) (2009, Argentina) by Lucía Puenzo
 Forbidden Fruit (2000, Germany/Zimbabwe) by Sue Maluwa-Bruce
 Forbidden Love: The Unashamed Stories of Lesbian Lives (1992, United States) by Lynne Fernie and Aerlyn Weissman
 Four More Years (Fyra år till) (2010, Sweden) by Tova Magnusson
 The Foxy Merkins (2013, United States) by Madeleine Olnek
 Francheska: Prairie Queen (2022, Canada) by Laura O'Grady
 Freelancers Anonymous (2018, United States) by Sonia Sebastián
 Fremde Haut (Unveiled) (2005, Germany) by Angelina Maccarone
 French Twist (Gazon maudit) (1995, France) by Josiane Balasko
 Fresh Kill (1994, United States) by Shu Lea Cheang
 Frida (2002, United States) by Julie Taymor
 Friendsgiving (2020, United States) by Nicol Paone

G

 Game Girls (2018, France/Germany) by Alina Skrzeszewska
 Gasoline (Benzina) (2001, Italy) by Monica Stambrini
 Gateways Grind (2022, United Kingdom) by Jacquie Lawrence
 Gayby Baby (2015, Australia) by Maya Newell
 Gekijōban Zero (Fatal Frame) (2014, Japan) by Mari Asato
 The Gendercator (2007, United States) by Catherine Crouch
 Gigola (2010, France) by Laure Charpentier
 Gillery's Little Secret (2006, United States) by T.M. Scorzafava
 The Girl (2000, United States/France) by Sande Zeig
 Girl King (2002, Canada) by Ileana Pietrobruno
 A Girl Like Me: The Gwen Araujo Story (2006, United States) by Agnieszka Holland 
 Girl Picture (Tytöt tytöt tytöt) (2022, Finland) by Alli Haapasalo
 Girl Play (2004, United States) by Lee Friedlander
 Girl Talk (2018, United States) by Erica Rose
 A Girl Thing (2001, United States) by Lee Rose
 Girlhood (Bande de filles) (2014, France) by Céline Sciamma
 Girltrash: All Night Long (2014, United States) by Alexandra Kondracke
 Girls Can't Swim (Les filles ne savent pas nager) (2000, France) by Anne-Sophie Birot
 Go Fish (1994, United States) by Rose Troche
 Goldfish Memory (2003, Ireland) by Elizabeth Gill
 Goodbye Emma Jo (1997, United States) by Cheryl Newbrough
 Gray Matters (2006, United States) by Sue Kramer
 A Great Ride (2018, United States) by Deborah Craig and Veronica Deliz
 The Ground Beneath My Feet (Der Boden unter den Füßen) (2019, Austria) by Marie Kreutzer 
 Grown Up Movie Star (2010, Canada) by Adriana Maggs

H

 The Half of It (2020, United States) by Alice Wu
 Hannah Free (2009, United States) by Wendy Jo Carlton
 Happiest Season (2020, United States) by Clea DuVall
 He Hated Pigeons (2015, Canada/Chile) by Ingrid Veninger
 Head On (1998, Australia) by Ana Kokkinos
 Heartland (2016, United States) by Maura Anderson
 Hide and Seek (1996, United States) by Su Friedrich
 High Art (1998, United States) by Lisa Cholodenko
 The Hill Where Lionesses Roar  (La colline où rugissent les lionnes; Luaneshat e kodrës) (2021, France/Kosovo) by Luàna Bajrami
 History Lessons (2000, United States) by Barbara Hammer
 Homemade Melodrama (1982, United Kingdom) by Jacqui Duckworth
 Hummer (2004, United States) by Guinevere Turner
 Humpday (2009, United States) by Lynn Shelton

I

 I Can't Think Straight (2008, United Kingdom) by Shamim Sarif
 I Carry You with Me (2020, United States/Mexico) by Heidi Ewing
 I Love Her (2017, Ukraine) by Darya Perelay
 I Shot Andy Warhol (1996, United Kingdom/United States) by Mary Harron
 If These Walls Could Talk 2 (2000, United States) by Jane Anderson, Martha Coolidge and Anne Heche
 I've Heard the Mermaids Singing (1987, Canada) by Patricia Rozema
 Il Vento e le Rose (Ai-suru to iu koto; The Awakening of Love) (2009, Japan/Italy) by Elisa Bolognini
 In Between (Arabic: Bar Bahar; Hebrew: Lo Po Lo Sham) (2016, Israel/France) by Maysaloun Hamoud
 The Incredibly True Adventure of Two Girls in Love (1995, United States) by Maria Maggenti
 Indian Summer (1996, United Kingdom) by Nancy Meckler
 Inescapable (2003, United States) by Helen Lesnick
 Intentions (2003, United States) by Luane Beck
 An Intimate Friendship (2000, United States) by Angela Evers Hughey
 It's in the Water (1997, United States) by Kelli Herd
 Itty Bitty Titty Committee (2007, United States) by Jamie Babbit

J

 Jack (2004, United States) by Lee Rose
 Jaded (1998, United States) by Caryn Krooth
 Jamie and Jessie Are Not Together (2011, United States) by Wendy Jo Carlton
 Je Tu Il Elle (1974, Belgium/France) by Chantal Akerman
 Jennifer's Body (2009, United States) by Karyn Kusama
 Jenny's Wedding (2015, United States) by Mary Agnes Donoghue
 Joe + Belle (2011, Israel) by Veronica Kedar
 The Journey (Sancharram) (2004, India) by Ligy J. Pullappally
 The Joy of Life (2005, United States) by Jenni Olson
 Just Friends (Gewoon Vrienden) (2018, Netherlands) by Ellen Smit
 Justine's Film (Le film de Justine) (1989, Canada) by Jeanne Crépeau

K

 Kajillionaire (2020, United States) by Miranda July.
 Kakera: A Piece of Our Life (2009, Japan) by Momoko Ando
 Kamikaze Hearts (1986, United States) by Juliet Bashore
 Keep Not Silent (2004, Israel) by Ilil Alexander
 The Kids Are All Right (2010, United States) by Lisa Cholodenko
 Kiki (2016, United States/Sweden) by Sara Jordenö
 Kiss Me Before It Blows Up (Kiss Me Kosher) (2020, Germany) by Shirel Peleg
 Kyss mig (Kiss Me; With Every Heartbeat) (2011, Sweden) by Alexandra-Therese Keining

L

 L Word Mississippi: Hate the Sin (2014, United States) by Lauren Lazin
 Lady Bird  (2017, United States) by Greta Gerwig 
 Last Call at Maud's (1993, United States) by Paris Poirier
 The Last Supper (1994, Canada) by Cynthia Roberts
 Late Bloomers (1996, United States) by Julia Dyer
 Laughing Matters (2003, United States) by Andrea Meyerson
 Laughing Matters... More! (2006, United States) by Andrea Meyerson
 Le derrière (The Rear End) (1999, France) by Valérie Lemercier
 The Lesbian Avengers Eat Fire, Too (1993, United States) by Su Friedrich and Janet Baus
 Lesbiana: A Parallel Revolution  (2012, Canada) by Myriam Fougère
 Let It Come Down: The Life of Paul Bowles (1998, Canada) by Jennifer Baichwal
 Lez Bomb (2018, United States) by Jenna Laurenzo
 Liebmann (The Strange Summer) (2016, Germany) by Jules Herrmann
 Life Partners (2014, United States) by Susanna Fogel
 Lightswitch (2009, Australia) by Emma Keltie
 Lily Festival (Yurisai) (2001, Japan) by Sachi Hamano
 Lines of Escape (Lignes de fuite) (2022, Canada) by Catherine Chabot and Miryam Bouchard
 Liz in September (Liz en Septiembre) (2014, Venezuela) by Fina Torres
 Lo Loves You (2017, Australia) by Cloudy Rhodes
 The Lollipop Generation (2008, Canada) by G. B. Jones
 Looking for Cheyenne (Oublier Cheyenne) (2005, France) by Valérie Minetto
 Lost and Delirious (2001, Canada) by Léa Pool
 Love Is Not Perfect (L’amore è imperfetto) (2012, Italy) by Francesca Muci
 Love/Juice (2000, Japan) by Kaze Shindō
 Love, Scott (2018, Canada) by Laura Marie Wayne
 Love and Other Catastrophes (1996, Australia) by Emma-Kate Croghan
 Lovesong (2016, United States) by So Yong Kim
 Loving Annabelle (2006, United States) by Katherine Brooks
 Loving Loretta (2008, Canada) by Andrea Gutsche

M

 Ma Belle, My Beauty (2021, United States/France) by Marion Hill
 Mädchen in Uniform (Girls in Uniform) (1931, Germany) by Leontine Sagan
 Maggie and Annie (2002, United States) by Kimberly K. Wilson
 Make a Wish (aka Lesbian Psycho) (2002, United States) by Sharon Ferranti
 Mango Kiss (2004, United States) by Sascha Rice
 Mapplethorpe (2018, United States) by Ondi Timoner
 Margarita (2012, Canada) by Laurie Colbert and Dominique Cardona
 Margarita with a Straw (2014, India) by Shonali Bose
 Marguerite (2017, Canada) by Marianne Farley
 Married in Canada (2010, Canada) by Arianne Robinson
 The Mars Canon (Kasei no Kanon) (2002, Japan) by Shiori Kazama
 Mary Marie (2011, United States) by Alexandra Roxo
 Me, Myself and Her (Io e Lei) (2015, Italy) by Maria Sole Tognazzi
 Meeting of Two Queens (Encuentro entre dos Reinas) (1991, Spain) by Cecilia Barriga
 The Midwife's Tale (1995, United States) by Megan Siler
 Miguel's War (2021, Germany/Spain/Lebanon) by Eliane Raheb
 Milkwater (2020, United States) by Morgan Ingari
 The Miseducation of Cameron Post  (2018, United States/United Kingdom) by Desiree Akhavan
 Mississippi Damned (2009, United States) by Tina Mabry
 Mom + Mom (Mamma + Mamma) (2018, Italy) by Karole Di Tommaso
 Moments (1979, France/Israel) by Michal Bat-Adam
 Mommy Mommy (2007, Canada) by Sylvie Rosenthal
 The Monkey's Mask (2000, Multi-nation) by Samantha Lang
 Monster (2003, United States) by Patty Jenkins
 Montana (2017, Israel) by Limor Shmila
 A Montreal Girl (La Fille de Montréal) (2010, Canada) by Jeanne Crépeau
 More Beautiful for Having Been Broken (2019, United States) by Nicole Conn
 Mosquita y Mari (2012, United States) by Aurora Guerrero
 Mother Tongue (Lengua materna) (2010, Argentina) by Liliana Paolinelli
 Mr. Gay Syria (2017, Turkey/France/Germany) by Ayse Toprak
 My Days of Mercy (2017, United States/United Kingdom) by Tali Shalom Ezer
 My Father Is Coming (1991, Germany) by Monika Treut
 My First Summer (2020, Australia) by Katie Found
 My Friend from Faro (Mein Freund aus Faro) (2008, German) by Nana Neul
 My Left Breast (2000, Canada) by Gerry Rogers and Peg Norman
 My Mother Likes Women (A mi madre le gustan las mujeres) (2002, Spain) by Inés París and Daniela Fejerman
 My Prairie Home (2013, Canada) by Chelsea McMullan

N

 Naomi and Ely's No Kiss List (2015, United States) by Kristin Hanggi
 Never Steady, Never Still (2017, Canada) by Kathleen Hepburn
 Nina's Heavenly Delights (2006, United Kingdom) by Pratibha Parmar
 Nitrate Kisses (1992, United States) by Barbara Hammer
 Nocturne (1990, United Kingdom) by Joy Chamberlain
 Nonsense Revolution (2008, Canada) by Ann Verrall
 November Moon (Novembermond) (1985, West Germany/France) by Alexandra von Grote

O

 Octavio Is Dead! (2018, Canada) by Sook-Yin Lee
 The Old Guard (2020, United States) by Gina Prince-Bythewood
 The Oldest Lesbian in the World (2011, United States) by Renee Sotile and Mary Jo Godges
 Olivia (aka The Pit of Loneliness) (1951, France) by Jacqueline Audry
 The One (2011, United States) by Caytha Jentis
 Orchids, My Intersex Adventure (2010, Australia) by Phoebe Hart
 Orlando (1992, United Kingdom) by Sally Potter
 Our Love Story (2016, South Korea) by Lee Hyun-ju
 Out at the Wedding (2007, United States) by Lee Friedlander
 Out of Season (1998, United States) by Jeanette L. Buck
 The Owls (2010, United States) by Cheryl Dunye

P

 The Paper Mirror: Drawing Alison Bechdel (2012, United States) by Charissa King-O'Brien
 Pariah (2011, United States) by Dee Rees
 Paris Is Burning (1990, United States) by Jennie Livingston
 Paris Was a Woman (1996, United Kingdom) by Greta Schiller
 Passage (2020, Canada) by Sarah Baril Gaudet
 The Passionate Pursuits of Angela Bowen (2016, United States) by Jennifer Abod and Mary Duprey
 A Perfect Ending (2012, United States) by Nicole Conn
 Perpetrator (2023, United States) by Jennifer Reeder
 Porcupine Lake (2017, Canada) by Ingrid Veninger
 Portrait of a Lady on Fire (Portrait de la jeune fille en feu) (2019, France) by Céline Sciamma
 Portrait of Jason (1967, United States) by Shirley Clarke
 Pourquoi pas! (Why Not!) (1977, France) by Coline Serreau
 The Power of the Dog (2021, Australia/New Zealand/United Kingdom/Canada) by Jane Campion
 Priest (1994, United Kingdom) by Antonia Bird
 Professor Marston and the Wonder Women (2017, United States) by Angela Robinson
 Puccini for Beginners (2006, United States) by Maria Maggenti
 Purple Sea (Viola di mare) (2009, Italy) by Donatella Maiorca

Q

 Queen of the Andes (2020, Canada) by Jillian Acreman
 Queens of the Qing Dynasty (2022, Canada) by Ashley McKenzie
 Queer Hutterite (2016, Canada) by Laura O'Grady
 Queering the Script (2019, Canada) by Gabrielle Zilkha

R

 Radical Harmonies (2002, United States) by Dee Mosbacher
 Rafiki (2018, Kenya) by Wanuri Kahiu
 Rain Beau's End (2021, United States) directed by Tracy Wren
 Raven's Touch (2015, United States) by Marina Rice Bader and Dreya Weber
 Rebel Dykes (2021, United Kingdom) by Harri Shanahan and Siân Williams
 Red Cow (Para Aduma) (2018, Israel) by Tsivia Barkai Yacov
 Red Doors (2005, United States) by Georgia Lee
 Reinventing Marvin (Marvin ou la belle éducation) (2017, France) Anne Fontaine
 Replay (La répétition) (2011, France/Canada) by Catherine Corsini
 Revoir Julie (Julie and Me) (1998, Canada) by Jeanne Crépeau
 Riot Girls (2019, Canada) by Jovanka Vuckovic
 Rome & Juliet (2006, Philippines) by Connie Macatuno
 Romeos (Romeos ... anders als du denkst!) (2011, Germany) by Sabine Bernardi
 Rough Night (2017, United States) by Lucia Aniello
 The Royal Road (2015, United States) by Jenni Olson
 Running on Empty Dreams (2009, United States) by Nitara Lee Osbourne

S

 The Saint of Dry Creek (2015, United States) by Julie Zammarchi
 Salut Victor (1989, Canada) by Anne Claire Poirier 
 Saving Face (2004, United States) by Alice Wu
 Se min kjole (Hush Little Baby) (2009, Denmark) by Hella Joof
 Season of Love (2019, United States) by Christin Baker
 Seduction: The Cruel Woman (Verführung: Die grausame Frau) (1985, West Germany) by Elfi Mikesch and Monika Treut
 Set Me Free (Emporte-moi) (1999, Canada) by Léa Pool
 Sévigné (2004, Spain) by Marta Balletbò-Coll
 The Sex of the Stars (Le sexe des étoiles) (1993, Canada) by Paule Baillargeon
 Shakedown (2018, United States) by Leilah Weinraub
 She: Their Love Story (She เรื่องรักระหว่างเธอ) (2012, Thailand) by Sarunya Noithai
 She Must Be Seeing Things (1987, United States) by Sheila McLaughlin
 She's a Boy I Knew (2007, Canada) by Gwen Haworth
 Shiva Baby (2020, United States) by Emma Seligman
 Signature Move (2017, United States) by Jennifer Reeder
 Sister My Sister (1994, United Kingdom) by Nancy Meckler
 Sisterhood (Gwaat Mui) (2016, Macau/Hong Kong) by Tracy Choi
 Skin Deep (1995, Canada) by Midi Onodera
 Sleeping Beauties (1999, United States) by Jamie Babbit
 Slip Away (2011, United States) by T.M. Scorzafava
 Snapshots (2018, United States) by Melanie Mayron
 Softly, Softly (Sotto.. sotto.. strapazzato da anomala passione) (1984, Italy) by Lina Wertmüller
 Some Prefer Cake (1997, United States) by Heidi Arnesen
 Someone Great (2019, United States) by Jennifer Kaytin Robinson 
 Sonja (2006, Germany) by Kirsi Marie Liimatainen
 Spidarlings (2016, United Kingdom) by Selene Kapsaski
 Spider Lilies (Cì Qīng) (2007, Taiwan) by Zero Chou
 Stitches (2011, Israel) by Adiya Imri Orr
 The Stolen Diary (Le cahier volé) (1993, France) by Christine Lipinska
 Straight for the Heart (À corps perdu) (1988, Canada/Switzerland) by Léa Pool
 Stuff (2015, United States) by Suzanne Guacci
 Suicide Kale (2016, United States) by Carly Usdin
 The Summer of Sangailė (Sangailės vasara) (2015, Lithuania/France/Netherlands) by Alantė Kavaitė
 Summerland (2020, United Kingdom) by Jessica Swale
 Summertime (La Belle Saison) (2015, France/Belgium) by Catherine Corsini
 Supervoksen (Triple Dare) (2006, Denmark) by Christina Rosendahl
 Sweetheart (2021, United Kingdom) by Marley Morrison
 Sword of Trust (2019, United States) by Lynn Shelton
 Sworn Virgin (Vergine giurata) (2015, Italy/Germany/Switzerland/Albania/Kosovo) by Laura Bispuri

T

 Take a Walk on the Wildside (2017, Canada) by Lisa Rideout
 Tallulah (2016, United States) by Sian Heder
 Tell It to the Bees (2018, United Kingdom) by Annabel Jankel
 Tender Fictions (1996, United States) by Barbara Hammer
 Thank God I'm a Lesbian (1992, Canada) by Dominique Cardona and Laurie Colbert
 They (2017, United States) by Anahita Ghazvinizadeh
 Thin Ice (1994, United Kingdom) by Fiona Cunningham-Reid
 Thirteen (2003, United States) by Catherine Hardwicke 
 This Place (2022, Canada) by V. T. Nayani
 Three Veils (2011, United States) by Rolla Selbak
 Tick Tock Lullaby (2007, United Kingdom) by Lisa Gornick
 Ticket of No Return (Bildnis einer Trinkerin) (1979, Germany) by Ulrike Ottinger
 Tig (2015, United States) by Kristina Goolsby and Ashley York
 Time & Again (2019, United Kingdom) by Rachel Dax
 To Each Her Own (2008, Canada) by Heather Tobin
 To the Stars (2019, United States) by Martha Stephens
 To Wong Foo, Thanks for Everything! Julie Newmar (1995, United States) by Beeban Kidron
 Today Match at 3 (Hoy partido a las 3) (2017, Argentina) by Clarisa Navas
 Tomboy (2008, Canada) by Barb Taylor
 Tomboy (2011, France) by Céline Sciamma
 Total Eclipse (1995, United Kingdom/France/Belgium) by Agnieszka Holland
 Tove (2020, Finland) by Zaida Bergroth
 Training Rules (2009, United States) by Dee Mosbacher and Fawn Yacker
 Transhood (2020, United States) by Sharon Liese
 Treading Water (2001, United States) by Lauren Himmel
 Trevor (1994, United States) by Peggy Rajski
 Tru Love (2013, Canada) by Shauna MacDonald and Kate Johnston
 The Truth About Jane (2000, United States) by Lee Rose
 Two 4 One (2014, Canada) by Maureen Bradley
 Two in the Bush: A Love Story (2017, United States) by Laura Madalinski

U

 Under the Tuscan Sun (2003, United States) by Audrey Wells
 An Unexpected Love (2003, United States) by Lee Rose
 Untold: Deal with the Devil (2021, United States) by Laura Brownson

V

 Valley Girl (2020, United States) by Rachel Lee Goldenberg
 Venus (2017, Canada) by Eisha Marjara
 A Village Affair (1995, United Kingdom) by Moira Armstrong
 Virgin Machine (Die Jungfrauenmaschine) (1988, Germany) by Monika Treut
 Vita and Virginia (2018, United Kingdom/Ireland) by Chanya Button

W

 Waiting for the Moon (1987, United Kingdom-France-United States-West Germany) by Jill Godmilow
 Walk with Me (2021, United States) by Isabel del Rosal
 Wasaga (1994, Canada) by Judith Doyle
 Water Lilies (Naissance des Pieuvres) (2007, France) by Céline Sciamma
 The Watermelon Woman (1996, United States) by Cheryl Dunye
 We Forgot to Break Up (2017, Canada) by Chandler Levack
 What's Cooking? (2000, United Kingdom/United States) by Gurinder Chadha
 When Night Is Falling (1995, Canada) by Patricia Rozema
 While You Weren't Looking (2015, South Africa) by Catherine Stewart
 Wild Nights with Emily (2018, United States) by Madeleine Olnek
 With Every Heartbeat (aka Kiss Me) (Kyss mig) (2011, Sweden) by Alexandra-Therese Keining
 Without Men (2011, United States) by Gabriela Tagliavini
 Women Who Kill (2016, United States) by Ingrid Jungermann
 The World to Come (2020, United States) by Mona Fastvold
 The World Unseen (2007, South Africa/United Kingdom) by Shamim Sarif

Y

 Yes or No (Yak Rak Ko Rak Loei) (2010, Thailand) by Sarasawadee Wongsompetch
 The Yo-Yo Gang (1992, Canada) by G.B. Jones
 Young & Wild (Joven y alocada) (2012, Chile) by Marialy Rivas
 You, Me and Him (2017, UK) by Daisy Aitkens
 You Will Be Mine (Je te mangerais) (2009, France) by Sophie Laloy
 Young Juliette (Jeune Juliette) (2019, Canada) by Anne Émond
 Your Sister's Sister (2011, United States) by Lynn Shelton
 Yuriko, Dasvidaniya (Yuriko, dasuvidânya; Yoshiko & Yuriko) (2011, Japan) by Sachi Hamano

Z

 Zoe.Misplaced (2014, Australia) by Mekelle Mills

See also
 List of female film and television directors
 List of lesbian filmmakers
 List of LGBTQ+-related films
 List of LGBTQ+-related films by storyline
 List of LGBTQ+-related films by year

Notes

References

Further reading
 
 
 
 

Books
 
 
 
 

Lists of LGBT-related films
LGBT
LGBT